Springdale Colony is a Hutterite community and census-designated place (CDP) in Meagher County, Montana, United States. It is in the southwestern part of the county, at the base of the Big Belt Mountains, which rise to the southwest.

The community was first listed as a CDP prior to the 2020 census.

Demographics

References 

Census-designated places in Meagher County, Montana
Census-designated places in Montana
Hutterite communities in the United States